Puppy Love is a British comedy television series broadcast on BBC Four. The first episode was shown on 13 November 2014. It was written by Joanna Scanlan and Vicki Pepperdine, co-creators of Getting On. Puppy Love follows two women at dog training classes on the Wirral.

Cast
Joanna Scanlan as Nana Vee
Vicki Pepperdine as Naomi Singh
Simon Fisher-Becker as  Tony Fazackerley
Selina Borji as Jasmine Singh
Sunetra Sarker as Lilli Kusiak (2 episodes)

Production
On 9 July 2013 Shane Allen, the controller of BBC comedy commissioning, announced the series along with the second series of Count Arthur Strong. The series was commissioned by Shane Allen and Janice Hadlow. Shane Allen said, "Puppy Love both celebrates and sends up the deeply held relationship between dogs and their owners. This is a real passion piece from Jo and Vicki who have yet again succeeded in creating a wonderful set of characters."

Episodes
Episode One (Thursday 13 November 2014)

Episode Two (Thursday 20 November 2014)

Episode Three (Thursday 27 November 2014)

Episode Four (Thursday 4 December 2014)

Episode Five (Thursday 11 December 2014)

Episode Six (Thursday 18 December 2014)

References

External links
 

2010s British sitcoms
2014 British television series debuts
2014 British television series endings
BBC television sitcoms
BBC high definition shows
Television shows set in Merseyside
English-language television shows